Phtheochroa baracana is a species of moth of the family Tortricidae. It is found in North America, where it has been recorded from New Jersey, Missouri, Alberta, Illinois, Indiana, Kentucky, Maine, Ohio, Pennsylvania and Vermont.

The wingspan is 14–18 mm. Adults have been recorded on wing from June to August.

References

Moths described in 1907
Phtheochroa